Međuhana is a village in the municipality of Blace, Serbia. According to the 2002 census, the village had a population of 187 people.

References

Populated places in Toplica District